Lionel Woodville (1447 – 23 June 1484) was a Bishop of Salisbury in England.

Life
Woodville was a fourth son of Richard Woodville, 1st Earl Rivers and Jacquetta of Luxembourg; his siblings included Elizabeth Woodville, Queen Consort from 1464 to 1483.

In the late 1470s, Woodville became the first person in recorded history to receive an honorary degree (DCL), from the University of Oxford. He was Chancellor of the University of Oxford from 1479 to 1483.

After a number of more minor clerical positions, Woodville was elected Dean of Exeter in November 1478, and held the position until 1482, when he became Bishop of Salisbury. He was nominated to Salisbury on 7 January 1482 and consecrated on 21 April 1482.

Woodville died about 23 June 1484.

Citations

References

External links
Fasti Ecclesiae Anglicanae 1300–1541, volume 9
Profile at catholic-hierarchy.org

1440s births
1484 deaths
Lionel
Younger sons of earls
Bishops of Salisbury
Deans of Exeter
Deans of Wolverhampton
15th-century English Roman Catholic bishops
Chancellors of the University of Oxford
Chancellors of the Order of the Garter